The 2017 Colorado Springs Switchbacks FC season was the club's third year of existence, and their third season in the Western Conference of the United Soccer League, the second tier of the United States Soccer Pyramid. On February 14, 2017 the Colorado Springs Switchbacks FC officially announced Weidner Apartment Homes had acquired the naming rights to the Switchbacks Stadium which has been rebranded as "Weidner Field". The team's mascot is Ziggy, who is a mountain goat.

Roster

Competitions

Preseason

USL Regular season

Standings

Matches

Schedule source

U.S. Open Cup 

The Switchbacks beat FC Tucson 2-0 in the second round of the U.S. Open Cup on Wednesday, May 17, 2017. The Switchbacks' goals were scored by Jun Gyeong Park and Kevaughn Frater.

The Switchbacks lost to OKC Energy FC 2-1 in the third round of the U.S. Open Cup on Wednesday, May 31, 2017. The Switchbacks' goal was scored by Jordan Burt.

References 

http://www.kktv.com/content/sports/Switchbacks-Add-Three-More-to-2017-Roster-415373293.html

Colorado Springs
Colorado Springs
Colorado Springs Switchbacks
Colorado Springs Switchbacks FC seasons